Botched is an American reality television series that premiered on cable channel E! on June 24, 2014. It follows doctors Terry Dubrow and Paul Nassif as they "remedy extreme plastic surgeries gone wrong."

Production
Botched first season, consisting of eight episodes, ended on August 17, 2014. A two-part reunion special hosted by Maria Menounos aired on October 26 and 27, and featured interviews with Dubrow, Nassif, and patients from the series.

On August 5, 2014, Botched was renewed for a second season, which premiered on April 14, 2015. On June 7, it moved from its Tuesday, 9 pm timeslot to Sunday, 9 pm. The mid-season finale aired on July 12. The series was renewed for a third season on July 1.

Three specials, titled Botched: Post Op, aired after the October 13, 20 and 27 episodes. The specials were co-hosted by Nassif, Dubrow, and Dubrow's wife, actress Heather Dubrow.

Season 3 premiered on May 10, 2016, starring both Dubrow and Nassif. It ended on August 2, 2016. In October 2015, the eight-episode spin-off series of Botched was announced entitled Botched by Nature. It premiered on August 9, 2016.

On November 12, 2020, the series was renewed for a seventh season which premiered in 2021.

On July 20, 2022, the series renewed for an eighth season, which will premiere in 2023.

Episodes

Series overview

Season 1 (2014)

Season 2 (2015)

Season 3 (2016)

Season 4 (2017–2018)

Season 5 (2018–2019)

Season 6 (2019–2020)

Season 7 (2021–2022)

Specials

References

External links 

 
 
 

2014 American television series debuts
2010s American medical television series
2010s American reality television series
2020s American medical television series
2020s American reality television series
E! original programming
English-language television shows
Television series about plastic surgery
Television series by MGM Television